Gundy Parish  is a civil parish of Gordon County, New South Wales. a Cadastral divisions of New South Wales.

The  parish is on the Macquarie River at the confluence with the Bell River and the only town in the parish is (West) Wellington, New South Wales. the nearest town.

Arthurville railway station on the (now disused) Molong–Dubbo railway line is in the parish.

References

Parishes of Gordon County (New South Wales)